John Coburn Stewart (September 5, 1939 – January 19, 2008) was an American songwriter and singer. He is known for his contributions to the American folk music movement of the 1960s while with the Kingston Trio (1961–1967) and as a popular music songwriter of the Monkees' No. 1 hit "Daydream Believer" and his own No. 5 hit "Gold" during a solo career spanning 40 years that included almost four dozen albums and more than 600 recorded songs.

Early life 
Born in San Diego, Stewart was the son of horse trainer John S. Stewart and spent his childhood and adolescence in Southern California, living mostly in the cities of Pasadena and Claremont. He graduated in 1957 from Pomona Catholic High School, which at the time was a coeducational school. Following graduation from high school, John went on to attend Mt. San Antonio Junior College in Walnut, California, during 1957–1958, when he was active in its music and theater programs.  He demonstrated an early talent for music, learning the guitar and banjo. He composed his first song, "Shrunken Head Boogie," when he was ten years old. In an interview in Michael Oberman's Music makers column (The Washington, DC Star Newspaper) on 30 October 1971, Stewart said, "I bought a ukulele when I was in Pasadena. I would listen to Sons of the Pioneers records. Tex Ritter really turned me on to music. 'I Love My Rooster' was Top Ten as far as I was concerned."

Musical career 
Stewart's first venture into popular music was with a high school garage band known as Johnny Stewart and the Furies. Influenced by the reigning icons of the day, Elvis Presley and Buddy Holly, the Furies toured southern California colleges and coffee houses, releasing one single, "Rockin' Anna," which was a minor, regional hit.

Following the breakup of the Furies and a short time as a member of the Woodsmen, Stewart teamed up with Gil Robbins (father of actor Tim Robbins) and John Montgomery to form the Cumberland Three, a group patterned after, and heavily influenced by, the increasingly popular Kingston Trio. The major accomplishment of the Cumberland Three was a two-LP set of Songs from the Civil War, with the albums containing a compilation of songs from the Confederacy and the Union, respectively. In all, the Cumberland Three released three albums, after which Stewart left the group to join the Kingston Trio, replacing Trio founder Dave Guard in 1961.

Kingston Trio years 
The Kingston Trio had emerged from the relatively crowded San Francisco folk music culture in 1957, using a mixture of calypso, pop, and folk styles, along with several forms of comedy, in their act. Relying on new pop-oriented arrangements of folk music classics as well as some original compositions, the Trio earned their first gold record with "Tom Dooley" and thereby launched a major revival in folk music that led to and influenced the careers of Bob Dylan, Peter, Paul, & Mary, and John Denver, among others. The group had become one of the best-known and best-selling acts on the folk music scene and were enjoying a lucrative recording and touring contract with Capitol Records, having ten albums under their collective belts, when Dave Guard departed the group in 1961 to explore other musical directions. Stewart was selected by the remaining members Nick Reynolds and Bob Shane as Guard's successor, bringing with him his respected skills as a musician, composer, and performer.

Reynolds, Shane, and Stewart recorded a dozen albums together, taking the music of the Trio into new directions, including more original material, and performing songs by relative newcomers Tom Paxton, Mason Williams and Gordon Lightfoot.

The pop-folk era began to wane as the music of groups such as the Beatles, the Rolling Stones, and fellow Californians the Beach Boys increasingly dominated the charts, and in 1967 the members of the Kingston Trio decided to disband.

Solo career, the post-Trio years 
Stewart continued to write songs and record for Capitol, while touring as a solo act. It was during this time that he composed the hit "Daydream Believer" for the Monkees, which was a hit for Anne Murray as well, and the closest Stewart came to writing a "standard". He later toured with Robert F. Kennedy's ill-fated 1968 presidential campaign and met and married in 1975 fellow folk singer Buffy Ford (with whom he remained until his death).  He recorded a string of albums, including his signature album, California Bloodlines, as well as Willard, Cannons in the Rain, and Wingless Angels.

Though usually successful with critics and a core group of fans, Stewart's albums were not considered commercial successes; he left Capitol after only two solo releases and was signed by Warner Bros. Records, where he also recorded just two albums before moving on to RCA Records, with whom he released three LPs (including a live performance album, The Phoenix Concerts). Stewart followed his release from RCA with a contract at the Robert Stigwood organization, the same organization that serviced the recording contracts for Eric Clapton, the Bee Gees, as well as several other disco performers. It was at RSO Records that Stewart enjoyed his most commercially successful years as a solo artist. Teaming up with Stevie Nicks and Lindsey Buckingham (then in Fleetwood Mac), Stewart recorded and released Bombs Away Dream Babies, which made it to #10 on Billboard'''s album chart and included the #5 hit, "Gold," in 1979. (Perhaps fittingly, considering the song's cynical attitude, Stewart later stopped performing "Gold" in concert, calling it "vapid" and "empty". The artist further claimed the tune meant nothing to him, having done it for the money and to please his record company.)

Two other tracks from Bombs Away, "Midnight Wind" and "Lost Her in the Sun", also hit the Top 40, making Stewart a sudden pop star at the age of 40. However, the follow-up album, Dream Babies Go Hollywood (1980), proved to be a commercial disappointment, hitting only #85 on the album chart. None of the singles from that LP (or any of his subsequent albums) made the Billboard Hot 100, though Stewart continued to perform right up to the time of his death.

 Later years 
Stewart's later and most significant success was as a songwriter. Several of his songs were recorded by a number of popular acts, including Nanci Griffith ("Sweet Dreams Will Come"), Rosanne Cash ("Runaway Train", "Dance with the Tiger"), Joan Baez ("Strange Rivers"). He also continued to record new material, producing CDs on his own "Neon Dreams" label in between commercial releases. They usually coincided with one of his tours. His last album was The Day the River Sang in 2006.

In his later years, Stewart teamed up with former Kingston Trio member Nick Reynolds to offer fans the ultimate Trio Fantasy: performing for and with Stewart and Reynolds. In 2005 and 2006 Bob Shane attended and performed a few songs with Stewart and Reynolds at the Trio Fantasy Camp, which is held annually in Scottsdale, Arizona.

A tape of Stewart's 1969 song "Mother Country" from California Bloodlines was played on the Apollo 11 spacecraft during its return to Earth. The production team of CNN's 2019 film "Apollo 11" heard the song while listening to archival footage of the flight and included a blend of the astronaut's tape  with the original studio recording of the tune in the soundtrack as the craft approached the Earth's atmosphere.

In 2001, Stewart was awarded the Lifetime Achievement Award by the World Folk Music Association.

Personal life
Stewart had a passion for painting, doing art shows and covers for his recordings and books. He continued to be a prolific songwriter and toured the United States and Europe regularly. He married Julie Koehler in 1960, having three children with her and resided in Marin County, California.  He met his second wife, Buffy Ford Stewart, through music and married her in 1975. Stewart's brother Mike, who died in 2002, founded the folk-rock group We Five in the mid 1960s. He was the uncle of Jamie Stewart of the band Xiu Xiu.

 Death 
In 2007, Stewart was diagnosed with the early stages of Alzheimer's disease, but resolved to continue performing for as long as he was able. On January 19, 2008, he died from a stroke at a San Diego hospital, ten days before a scheduled performance in Scottsdale, Arizona. He was 68 years old.

In addition to his wife, Buffy, he was survived by their son Luke, along with three children from a previous marriage: Amy, Jeremy, and Mikael (a sound technician).

Discography
The Cumberland ThreeFolk Scene U.S.A., 1960Civil War Almanac - "Yankees" Vol. 1, 1960Civil War Almanac - "Rebels" Vol. 2, 1960

The Kingston Trio

SoloSignals Through the Glass, John Stewart and Buffy Ford, 1968California Bloodlines, 1969 #193Willard, 1970The Lonesome Picker Rides Again, 1971Sunstorm, 1972Cannons in the Rain, 1973 #202The Phoenix Concerts, 1974Wingless Angels, 1975Fire in the Wind, 1977Bombs Away Dream Babies, 1979Gold, 1979 (compilation)John Stewart in Concert, version of Phoenix Concerts, 1980Forgotten Songs of Some Old Yesterday, 1980Dream Babies Go Hollywood, 1980Blondes, 1982Revenge of the Budgie, John Stewart and Nick Reynolds, 1983Trancas, 1984Centennial, 1984The Last Campaign, 1985Punch the Big Guy, 1987The Complete Phoenix Concerts, 1990
American Sketches (re-release of Centennial), 1990Deep in the Neon, 1991Neon Beach, 1991Bullets in the Hour Glass, 1992American Originals, 1992Chilly Winds, 1993Airdream Believer, 1995Bandera, 1995Turning Music into Gold - The Best of John Stewart, 1995American Journey [box: The Last Campaign, The Trio Years, An American Folk Song Anthology], 1996The Trio Years, 1996
 An American Folk Song Anthology, 1996Live at The Turf Inn, Scotland, John Stewart and Buffy Ford, 1996Rough Sketches, 1997Teresa and the Lost Songs, 1998One Night in Denver, 1998Gold, 1999John Stewart & Darwins Army, 1999Rocket Roy in the Real World, 1999Way Too Much Fun, 2000Buster, 2000Wires from the Bunker, 2000Savannah, 2000Johnny Moonlight, 2000Front Row Music: Before the War, 2001Armstrong, 2001The Americans, 2002A Night at Jimmy Duke's - Johnny and the Nasty Britches, 2002The Runner, 2002Secret Tapes, 2002Ballads, 2003Havana, 2003Tanforan, 2003Earth Rider, 2003Songs to Drive By, 2003The Complete Blondes, 2003The Day the River Sang, 2006An Introduction to John Stewart (California Bloodlines + Willard), 2006Bite My Foot, 2009The Amazing ZigZag Concert, 2010 (Disc 3 of 5-CD box set, recorded in April, 1974)Summer's Child, 2012 (Radio show broadcast live from Ebbet's Field, Denver, Colorado, 1975)One Night in Prescott, 2016Old Forgotten Altars: The 1960s Demos'', 2020

References

External links
 The Kingston Trio
 
 
 

1939 births
2008 deaths
American banjoists
American folk singers
American folk-pop singers
American male singer-songwriters
Musicians from San Diego
Singer-songwriters from California
Capitol Records artists
Warner Records artists
RCA Records artists
RSO Records artists
Polydor Records artists
20th-century American singers
Deaths from intracranial aneurysm
20th-century American male singers
Shanachie Records artists
The Kingston Trio members